Olga Nikolaevna Gavrilova (8 February 1957 – Svobodny, Amur Oblast, 3 January 2022) was a Russian track and field athlete who competed in the javelin throw.

Alongside Natalya Lisovskaya, she was only one of two Soviet female winners at the competition and helped her nation to second place in the team rankings. Gavrilova has only placed ninth at the Soviet Athletics Championships that year and brought an end to Felke's 26-meeting undefeated streak.

Gavrilova died in Svobodny on 3 January 2022, at the age of 64.

References

External links

1957 births
2022 deaths
Russian female javelin throwers
Soviet female javelin throwers
Athletes from Saint Petersburg